Muscat Club is an Omani sports club based in  Muscat, Oman. The club is currently playing in the Oman Professional League, the highest league of the Oman Football Association. Their home ground is Sultan Qaboos Sports Complex, but they also recognize the older Royal Oman Police Stadium as their home ground. Both stadiums are government owned, but Muscat Club also own their own personal stadium and sports equipments, as well as their own training facilities.

Being a multisport club
Although being mainly known for their football, Muscat Club like many other clubs in Oman, have not only football in their list, but also hockey, volleyball, handball, basketball, badminton and squash. They also have a youth football team competing in the Omani Youth league.

Colors, kit providers and sponsors
Like the Oman national football team, Muscat Club have also long-chosen red or white (with black shorts) (Away) as the colors to represent them, varying themselves from neighbors Bowsher Club (Blue) and Oman Club (Red) kits. They have also had many different sponsors over the years.

Honours and achievements

National titles
Omani League (3): 
Winners 1977-78, 2002-03, 2005-06
Runners-up 2003–04 
Oman First Division League (1):
Winners 2014-15
Sultan Qaboos Cup (1): 
Winners 2003 (As Ruwi)
Runners up 2004, 2007
Oman Super Cup (2): 
Winners 2004, 2005

Performance in international competitions

AFC competitions
AFC Cup : 1 appearance
2007 : Group Stage

UAFA competitions
Gulf Club Champions Cup: 3 appearances
2005 : 3rd Position
2006 : Group Stage
2007 : Group Stage

Handball

Current squad
Squad for the 2022–23 season

Centre Backs
23  Mujtaba Al-Zaimoor

References

External links
Muscat Club Profile at Soccerway.com
Muscat Club Profile at Goalzz.com

Year of establishment missing
Football clubs in Oman
Omani League
Sports clubs in Muscat, Oman